Yeghnik, known until 1946 as Dadalu, is a village in the Talin Municipality of the Aragatsotn Province of Armenia. The village's church, Saint Nshan, dates back to 1866.

References 

Report of the results of the 2001 Armenian Census

Populated places in Aragatsotn Province